Thomas Warsop (christened 29 September 1778 – 28 February 1845) was an English cricketer who played a single match of first-class cricket for a combined Nottinghamshire and Leicestershire side in 1803.

Warsop was born at Nottingham. He was considered a good all-rounder who batted right-handed and bowled slow right-arm underarm deliveries. He captained Nottingham Cricket Club, which he first played for in 1791 aged 12. Three of his brothers, Richard, William and Samuel, also played for the club.

He retired after the 1823 season and died at his home in Pepper Street, Nottingham, in 1845 aged 65.

References

External links

1778 births
1845 deaths
English cricketers
English cricketers of 1787 to 1825
Cricketers from Nottingham